Live Forever is the debut studio album by English-born American musician Bartees Strange. It was released on October 2, 2020, by Memory Music.

Production
The album was recorded in a barn studio in Wassaic, New York, and mastered by American producer Will Yip.

Release
On July 23, 2020, Strange released the first single from the album "Mustang". The single has been described as "something of an indie rock anthem wrapped up in mesmerizing synths, catchy riffs and bombastic vocals." The music video was shot at Bartees Strange's apartment in Washington DC, with director Drew Horen. It was also featured as the Top 8 Best Song of the week by Paste on July 24, 2020. and Top 9 Songs of the Week by Under the Radar.

On August 12, 2020, Strange announced the release of his debut album, along with the second single "Boomer". The single has been described "a tight indie rock track driven by jangly guitars" while the music video shows Strange performing all the song's instruments from his home studio.

The third single "Kelly Rowland" was released on September 18, 2020. Along with the deluxe edition, Strange released the new version of the song titled "Free Kelly Rowland" with hip hop group Armand Hammer on October 1, 2021.

Composition
The songs on Live Forever weave in sundry sounds and styles.

"Mustang" works in "infectious" guitar-pop, "sweltering" punk and "hooky" synth-rock. "Boomer" digs into "giddy" blues rock and hip hop verses. "Flagey God" channels experimental rock and witch house while working in "propulsive" dance-pop with a R&B chorus.

Critical reception
Live Forever was met with "universal acclaim" reviews from critics. At Metacritic, which assigns a weighted average rating out of 100 to reviews from mainstream publications, this release received an average score of 83 based on 6 reviews. At AnyDecentMusic?, which collates album reviews from websites, magazines and newspapers, they gave the release a 7.7 out of 10, based on a critical consensus of 7 reviews.

Gareth O'Malley of Beats Per Minute wrote: "There’s so much ground covered on Live Forever that its easy to forget that it’s 35 minutes long. Strange’s genreless approach to making music means that its eventual follow-up could explore any of the sonic avenues the album heads down – or something else entirely" Writing for Exclaim!, Adam Feibel explained: "As intriguing as Strange's music already is, Live Forever demonstrates that there's still tremendous potential left to unlock." He went on to say that the release "is itself not quite a masterpiece, but it's a clear picture of someone who's destined for greatness. Bartees Strange is a visionary artist worth watching closely."

Accolades

Track listing

References

2020 albums
Bartees Strange albums
Jazz albums by American artists
Jazz rap albums